Cartmel Priory Gatehouse is a medieval building  located at Cartmel, Grange-over-Sands, Cumbria, England. It is listed grade II* and is part of a scheduled monument. It belongs to the National Trust.

Along with the church, the gatehouse is all that remains of the Augustinian Cartmel Priory. The priory was founded in 1190 whereas the gatehouse was built about 1330. In 1536 the Priory was dissolved as part of the general reformation of Church. Most of the monastic property was demolished, but the gatehouse was by that time serving as courthouse for the manor of Cartmel, so survived.  It is described by English Heritage as an excellent example of a medieval monastic gatehouse.

The building served as a grammar school from 1624 to 1790. In 1923 the gatehouse became a museum, and was used for exhibitions and meetings, before being presented to the National Trust in 1946. By 2011 it was mainly in private residential use, although the Great Room is opened to the public on  several days a year.

See also

Grade II* listed buildings in South Lakeland
Listed buildings in Lower Allithwaite
Cartmel Racecourse
Cark and Cartmel railway station

References

Augustinian monasteries in England
Former school buildings in the United Kingdom
Gates in England
Grade II* listed buildings in Cumbria
Monasteries in Cumbria
National Trust properties in Cumbria
Tourist attractions in Cumbria
1190 establishments in England
1536 disestablishments in England
Christian monasteries established in the 12th century
Gatehouses (architecture)
Cartmel